2013 ACC tournament may refer to:

 2013 ACC men's basketball tournament
 2013 ACC women's basketball tournament
 2013 ACC men's soccer tournament
 2013 ACC women's soccer tournament
 2013 Atlantic Coast Conference baseball tournament
 2013 Atlantic Coast Conference softball tournament